Sociologia Ruralis is a quarterly peer-reviewed academic journal covering social-science research on rural areas and related issues with a focus on social, political and cultural aspects of rural development, including class, economics, government, and poverty. It was established in 1960 and is published by Wiley-Blackwell on behalf of the European Society for Rural Sociology.

According to the Journal Citation Reports, the journal has a 2012 impact factor of 1.022, ranking it 54th out of 137 journals in the category "Sociology".

See also
Rural sociology

References

External links 
 

Wiley-Blackwell academic journals
English-language journals
Publications established in 1960
Quarterly journals
Sociology journals
Rural sociology